The Venerable  Michael John Macdonald Paton was an eminent Anglican priest and author in the 20th century.

Paton was born on 25 November 1922, and educated at Repton and Magdalen College, Oxford. After service with the Indian Army and the Foreign Office, he was ordained in 1954. He was a curate at  All Saints’, Gosforth and then held  incumbencies at St Chad's, Sheffield and  St Mark's, Broomhill. In 1978 he was appointed Archdeacon of Sheffield, a post he held for nine years. He died on 6 November 2016.

References

	

1922 births
People educated at Repton School
Alumni of Magdalen College, Oxford
20th-century English Anglican priests
Archdeacons of Sheffield
2016 deaths